Lithocarpus burkillii is a species of plant in the family Fagaceae. It is a tree endemic to Peninsular Malaysia. It is threatened by habitat loss. It has been named after Isaac Henry Burkill.

References

burkillii
Endemic flora of Peninsular Malaysia
Trees of Peninsular Malaysia
Vulnerable plants
Taxonomy articles created by Polbot
Taxa named by Aimée Antoinette Camus